The 2016 British Speedway Championship is the 56th edition of the British Speedway Championship. Tai Woffinden was the three-time defending champion having won the title in 2013, 2014 and 2015, however decided against competing in the 2016 event.  The competition consisted of two semi-finals and a final. Seven riders qualified from each semi-final and were joined by two nominated wildcards in the decider. The final took place at the National Speedway Stadium in Belle Vue, Manchester on 13 June 2016, and was won by Danny King, his first title. He beat Craig Cook, who finished second for the third straight year, Robert Lambert and Steve Worrall in the final.

Results

Semi-Final 1 
  Scunthorpe
 13 May 2016

Semi-Final 2 
  Glasgow
 15 May 2016

The Final 
  National Speedway Stadium, Manchester
 13 June 2016

See also 
 British Speedway Championship

References 

British Speedway Championship
Great Britain